The Samuel Smith Tavern Site is a historic archeological site in Wellfleet, Massachusetts.  It encompasses the remains of a late 17th-century tavern operated by Samuel Smith, owner of Great Island, which shelters Wellfleet Harbor.  The tavern site is located within the Cape Cod National Seashore, and is accessible via the Great Island Trail.  The site was excavated in 1969–70, recovering thousands of artifacts, including clay pipes, drinking artifacts, a harpoon, and a chopping block fashioned from whale vertebrae.

The tavern site was listed on the National Register of Historic Places in 1977.

See also
National Register of Historic Places listings in Barnstable County, Massachusetts
National Register of Historic Places listings in Cape Cod National Seashore

References

1690 establishments in Massachusetts
Buildings and structures completed in 1690
Buildings and structures in Barnstable County, Massachusetts
Commercial buildings completed in the 17th century
Drinking establishments on the National Register of Historic Places in Massachusetts
National Register of Historic Places in Cape Cod National Seashore
Wellfleet, Massachusetts